Maria Dolors Bramon Planes (born 31 December 1943) is a Spanish philologist, historian, and university professor specializing in the Muslim world.

Biography
Dolors Bramon married Ernest Lluch in 1966, with whom she had three daughters – Eulàlia, Rosa, and Mireia – and whom she accompanied to Valencia in 1970 when he joined its University. They lived there for a decade, until 1977.

From 1968 to 1983 she was an editor of the Gran Enciclopèdia Catalana. In December 1977 she graduated from the University of Barcelona, where from 1979 to 1984 she was an assistant professor and received a doctorate in Semitic Philology.

In 1984 she became an interim assistant professor at the University of Zaragoza, and secured a titled position in 1986. A year later, in December 1987, she returned to the University of Barcelona as a full professor of Arab and Islamic Studies. In 1998 she received her doctorate in Medieval History.

A specialist in the Islamic period in the Crown of Aragon, and especially in Catalonia, Bramon's work has focused on the presence of religious minorities (Mudejars, Jews) in these territories, Islamic theology, women in Islam, as well as philological studies on the influence and presence of Arabisms in the languages of the Iberian Peninsula.

In 1990 she was appointed director of the Historical Archive of Banyoles, a position which she held until February 2008. She was also advisor of the Lexographic and Onomastic Offices of the Institut d'Estudis Catalans beginning in 2000, and collaborator at the Philological Section of the Institute beginning in 2002.

Since 2014 she has been president of the World University Service of the Mediterranean (WUSMED).

Awards
 1976  for Una lengua, dos lenguas, tres lenguas, as a member of a group of six people who presented a set of works
 1981 Joan Fuster Essay Award for Contra moros i jueus (Contra moros y judíos)

Works
 Raons d'identitat del País Valencià. Pèls i senyals (1976)
 Egipto (1979), Editorial Castell, Barcelona 
 Contra moros i jueus: Formació i estratègia d'unes discriminacions al País Valencià (1981), 
 Spanish translation: Contra moros y judíos (1986), Ed. Península, Barcelona, 
 El mundo en el siglo XII. Estudio de la versión castellana de una geografía universal: El Tratado de al-Zuhrî (1991), Ed. Ausa, Sabadell, 
 Nous Textos d'historiadors musulmans referents a la Catalunya Medieval (continuació de l'obra de ), doctoral thesis, published under the same title by the University of Barcelona in 1999, 
 De quan érem o no musulmans. Textos del 713 al 1010 (2000), 
 Una introducción al islam: religión, historia y cultura (2002), 
 Mots remots. Setze estudis d'història i de toponímia catalana (2002), CCG edicions, Gerona, with Rosa Lluch Bramon
 Ser dona i musulmana (2007), Ed. Cruïlla and Fundación Joan Maragall, Barcelona, 
 Spanish translation: Ser mujer y musulmana (2009), Ed. Bellaterra, Barcelona
 En torno al islam y las musulmanas (2010), Ed. Bellaterra, Barcelona
 Moros, jueus i cristians en terra catalana. Memòria del nostre passat (2013), Pagès editor, Lérida, 
 Spanish translation: Moros, judíos y cristianos en tierra catalana. Memoria de nuestro pasado (2013), Ed. Milenio, Lérida
 L'islam avui. Alguns aspectes controvertits (2016), Fragmenta Editorial, Barcelona,

References

External links

 Dra. Dolors Bramon at the University of Barcelona

1943 births
20th-century Spanish historians
20th-century Spanish women writers
21st-century Spanish women writers
Spanish Arabists
Historians from Catalonia
Catalan-language writers
Philologists from Catalonia
Women philologists
Women writers from Catalonia
Living people
Members of the Institute for Catalan Studies
Spanish encyclopedists
Spanish medievalists
Spanish women historians
People from Girona
University of Barcelona alumni
Academic staff of the University of Barcelona
Academic staff of the University of Zaragoza
Women historians
Women scholars of Islam